Guido Roffi (1924–1973) was a Welsh professional footballer. An inside-forward, he joined Newport County in 1947 from Tynte Rovers. He went on to make 112 Football League appearances for Newport, scoring 27 goals between 1947 and 1951.

In 1950, Roffi scored four goals (all with his head) during a match in which Newport beat Aldershot 7–0.

Roffi was ineligible to represent Wales due to his Italian roots. His parents had previously traveled to Wales from Lombardy, Italy.

Roffi died at the age of 49 after suffering with illness. To mark his passing, the 'Roffi Cup' was set up in his memory, a football tournament in which Cynon Valley junior schools compete.

References

External links
Post War English & Scottish Football League A - Z Player's Transfer Database profile

Welsh footballers
Newport County A.F.C. players
English Football League players
1924 births
1973 deaths
Date of death missing
Association football inside forwards
Welsh people of Italian descent
Tynte Rovers A.F.C.players